Gupshup is a leading conversational messaging platform, powering over 6 billion messages per month. Across verticals, thousands of large and small businesses in emerging markets use Gupshup to build conversational experiences across marketing, sales and support and 3400 employees. With primary operations in India, United States, Europe, Latin America, Africa, Middle East and South East Asia, it is owned and operated by Webaroo Inc.

Gupshup’s carrier-grade platform provides a single messaging API for 30+ channels, a rich conversational experience-building tool kit for any use case and a network of emerging market partnerships across messaging channels, device manufacturers, ISVs and operators. 

With Gupshup, businesses have made conversations an integral part of their customer engagement success. The company provides Messaging, Voice, Video, USSD and IP messaging, and chatbot development services to BFSI (banking, financial services and insurance), retail, e-commerce, Fintech, EdTech, Healthcare and Media & Entertainment companies.

History 
Gupshup was founded in 2004 by Beerud Sheth as an SMS network in India and is headquartered in Cupertino, California.. In 2006, Gupshup launched an SMS-based social network that grew to 70M users. 

Gupshup also developed a smart messaging app, Teamchat, which introduced patent-pending “smart” messages in 2014, only now being offered by other messaging apps. Gupshup’s Smart messaging platform also provides tools for developers to quickly and easily build, test, deploy, monitor, and track bots and other smart messaging services.

In 2015, the multi-channel server less bot platform went live. In 2016, Gupshup launched partnership with FBM, and launched APIs for Slack, Telegram, and introduced their bot platform and bot builder tools.

In 2017, the company was one of the earliest global partners of WhatsApp. Gupshup also created the Interbot framework and built chatbots for Google Assistant, Alexa, to name a few. In 2018, Gupshup partnered with leading handset OEMs to deliver rich messaging experience. 

In 2020, the company launched its very own IP Messaging channel - Gupshup IP Messaging aka GIP. In July 2021, the company raised $240 million in a Series F financing round led by Fidelity Management, Tiger Global and others.

Other important acquisitions include:

 In September 2021, Gupshup acquired DOTGO, a rich communications system (RCS) business messaging (RBM) player based in New Jersey.
 In February 2022, Gupshup acquired AI-powered Voice Leader, Knowlarity Communications, strengthening its Conversational Engagement portfolio.
 In April 2022, Gupshup acquired Active.ai, the Leading Conversational AI Platform for Banks and Fintech Companies..

Technology 
In April 2016, Gupshup launched one of the first chatbot building platforms (gupshup.io) in the world. As of September 2017, the company had over 30,000 chatbots across 22 channels like Facebook Messenger, SMS, Twitter, Hangouts, Google Home, Amazon Alexa, WeChat, Skype, Microsoft Teams, and email.

In 2021, the platform was used by more than 100,000 businesses and developers.

References

External links 
 https://www.gupshup.io

Software companies of the United States